Callechelys leucoptera is an eel in the family Ophichthidae (worm/snake eels). It was described by Jean Cadenat in 1954. It is a tropical, marine eel which is known from the eastern Atlantic Ocean, including Senegal to Côte d'Ivoire. It is known to dwell at a depth of 45 metres. It inhabits shallow waters where it forms burrows in the sand, which are sometimes exposed during low tide. Males can reach a maximum total length of 73 centimetres, but more commonly reach a TL of 50 centimetres.

C. leucoptera is preyed upon by the African wedgefish (Rhynchobatus luebberti) and the white grouper (Epinephelus aeneus).

References

Ophichthidae
Fish of the Atlantic Ocean
Fish described in 1954
Taxa named by Jean Cadenat